Kornelia Moskwa (born 30 October 1996 in Ruda Śląska) is a Polish volleyball player. She plays for BKS Stal Bielsko-Biała in the TAURON Liga.

References

External links
 

Living people
1996 births
Polish women's volleyball players
Sportspeople from Ruda Śląska
21st-century Polish women